The Case is Altered is a Grade II listed public house at Southill Lane, Eastcote, northwest London.

It dates from the 16th century.

References

External links
 

Grade II listed buildings in the London Borough of Hillingdon
Grade II listed pubs in London
Pubs in the London Borough of Hillingdon
Eastcote